Scraggane is a fishing port located on the Maharees peninsula near Castlegregory in County Kerry, Ireland.  

The main local catch consists of lobster, flat-back crab, spider crab, Atlantic crayfish, Atlantic salmon and mackerel. Scraggane is home to a fleet of about twenty fishing trawlers.

Scraggane Bay is used as a flatwater windsurfing venue owing, and is also sailable in almost any conditions, regardless of wind direction.

External links
 Directions for visiting sailing vessels

See also
 List of towns and villages in Ireland

References

Towns and villages in County Kerry